Spain took part in the Eurovision Song Contest  for the first time in 1961. The country was represented by Conchita Bautista with the song "Estando contigo", written by Antonio Guijarro and Augusto Algueró. The song was chosen through a national final.

Before Eurovision

National final 
The national final took place at RNE's studios in Barcelona from February 13 to 14, hosted by Federico Gallo, Jorge Arandes and María del Carmen García Lecha, and was aired through radio. Ten songs competed over two shows, with the winner song being decided upon through jury voting.

Competing entries

Semi-final 
The semi-final took place on 13 February 1961. The ten competing songs were presented, and six of these songs went forward to the national final. The jury consisted of 10 members, 5 music experts and 5 plain citizens. The music experts were:

 Sebastià Gasch – Journalist at RNE, writer, art critic
 Diego Ramírez Pastor – Journalist, president at Asociación de la Prensa de Barcelona
 Arthur Kaps – Producer at TVE
 Alfonso Banda Moras – Director of current afairs at RNE for Barcelona
 Carlos Moltó Arniches – Delegate at Sociedad General de Autores y Editores for Barcelona

The plain citizens were Alberto Rovira, María Amparo Gascón, Carmen Navarro, Joaquina Navarro and Pilar Agudo Villegas.

Final 
The final took place on 14 February 1961, with the same hosts and jury members. The winner, "Estando contigo" performed by Conchita Bautista, was selected through jury voting, which she won by just one point.

At Eurovision
On the night of the final, 18 March 1961, Conchita Bautista performed first in the running order, preceding Monaco. At the close of voting "Estando contigo" had received 8 points, placing Spain 9th of the 16 entries. The Spanish jury awarded its highest mark (3) to the United Kingdom.

Voting
Every country had a jury of ten people. Every jury member could give one point to his or her favourite song.

References

1961
Countries in the Eurovision Song Contest 1961
Eurovision